A running club, also known in some parts of the United States as a running crew , is an eclectic institution specialising in running and oriented towards the sport and recreation of running or track and field. The club may train for and compete in cross country, road running, fell running, track and field some clubs even branch out into multi discipline sports such as triathlon.

Since the early 2000s, alternative running clubs or crews have emerged and they differ from traditional running clubs as the focus is on urban running on city streets. One of the crews widely considered to be the first is the Bridge Runners formed by Mike Saes in New York City in 2004. In 2006, Charlie Dark formed Run Dem Crew in London which has since grown to several hundred people who meet every Tuesday, and has led to Dark receiving a Points of Light award from the UK prime minister Theresa May for his dedication to establishing the alternative running community.

Clubs by country

International
Achilles International
HSI

Greece

Portugal

Turkey

United Kingdom

United States

See also
Parkrun

References

Lists of sports teams